In Colorado, State Highway 25 may refer to:
Interstate 25 in Colorado, the only Colorado highway numbered 25 since 1968
Colorado State Highway 25 (1938-1968) east of Sterling, now SH 55